Frederick Jerome Bohannon (May 31, 1958 – February 8, 1999) was an American football defensive back who played one season in  the National Football League (NFL) with the Pittsburgh Steelers.

Early life
Bohannon was born in Birmingham, Alabama and attended Woodlawn High School.  He matriculated at Mississippi Valley State University.

Pro football   career
Bohannon signed with the Toronto Argonauts of the Canadian Football League prior to the 1982 NFL Draft.  He quickly became disenchanted with his situation in Toronto and asked the team for his release.  His request was granted after the team's second exhibition game.

Shortly after leaving Toronto, Bohannon contacted the Pittsburgh Steelers who signed him.  He was on the Steelers roster for seven games in the strike-shortened 1982 season.  He was used primarily on special teams as a kickoff returner and in kick coverage.  Bohannon was placed on the Steelers injured reserve list prior to the 1983 season due to a thigh injury and he never again played for the team.

Bohannon later caught on with his hometown Birmingham Stallions of the United States Football League in 1984.  He was cut by the Stallions in January 1985.

He attended training camp with the Tampa Bay Buccaneers in 1985, but was cut prior to the start of the season.

Post-football life
After leaving football, Bohannon attended the police academy in Birmingham.

References

1958 births
1999 deaths
Players of American football from Birmingham, Alabama
American football defensive backs
Mississippi Valley State Delta Devils football players
Pittsburgh Steelers players
Birmingham Stallions players